Octavius Sabinus was a governor of Britannia Inferior, a province of Roman Britain some time between c. AD 262 and 266.

An inscription at Lancaster mentions him in connection with repairs there. It indicates that he was of the senatorial rank rather than the third century norm of giving military commands such as this to officers of equestrian standing.

Roman governors of Britain
Ancient Romans in Britain
3rd-century Romans